This is a list of spreads. A spread is a food that is literally spread, generally with a knife, onto food items such as bread or crackers. Spreads are added to food to enhance the flavor or texture of the food, which may be considered bland without it.

Spreads

 

 Aioli –  sauce made of garlic, salt, and olive oil of the northwest Mediterranean
 Ajvar – Southeast European condiment made from red bell peppers, eggplants, garlic and oil
 Amlu – Moroccan spread of argan oil, almonds and honey
 Bacon jam
 Bean dip – sometimes used as a spread
 Beer jam
 Biber salçası – Anatolian paste made from red chili peppers or sweet long peppers and salt
 Biscoff – Sweet paste made from Biscoff biscuits
 Butter
 Rucava white butter
Chocolate butter
 Chutney – sauce of the Indian subcontinent of tomato relish, a ground peanut garnish or a yogurt, cucumber and mint dip
 Cheong – various sweetened Korean foods in the form of syrups, marmalades and fruit preserves
 Chili con carne
 Chocolate spread
 Gianduja
 Nutella
 Citadel spread – paste made of peanut butter, oil, sugar and milk powder
 Clotted cream
 Coconut jam - a general term for coconut-based jams in Southeast Asia. Coconut jams include kaya of Indonesia, Malaysia, and Singapore; sangkhaya of Thailand; and matamis sa bao, latik, or kalamay of the Philippines.
 Cookie butter
 Cretons – pork spread containing onions and spices, from Quebec
 Dulce de Leche – confection from Latin America prepared by slowly heating sweetened milk
 Egg butter
 Electuary (Larwerge) – a honey-thickened juice spread popular in Switzerland, often made with forest fruit such as juniper or pine
 Féroce –  made of avocados, cassava, olive oil, lime juice, salt cod, garlic, chili peppers, hot sauce, and seasonings, from Martinique
 Filet américain – Belgian variation of Steak tartare
 Flora
 Foie gras
 Guacamole
 Heinz Sandwich Spread
 Honey
 Hummus
 Smörgåskaviar – a fish roe spread eaten in Scandinavia and Finland
 Kartoffelkäse
 Kaya (jam) – coconut jam, commonly eaten as Kaya toast
 Kyopolou – Bulgarian and Turkish spread made from roasted eggplants and garlic
 Latik – also known as "coconut caramel", a traditional Filipino sweet syrup made from coconut milk and sugar.
 Liver spread – also known as "lechon sauce", a Filipino spread made from pureed cooked pork or chicken liver with spices, vinegar, and brown sugar.
 Ljutenica – vegetable relish or chutney in Bulgaria, Macedonia and Serbia
 Lox
 Manjar blanco – term used in Spanish-speaking world to a variety of milk-based delicacies
 Manteca colorá – Andalusian spread prepared by adding spices and paprika to lard, cooked with minced or finely chopped pieces of pork
 Maple butter
 Margarine
 Marshmallow creme
 Mint jelly
 Moambe – also referred to as palm butter, or palm cream
 Mayonnaise
 Miracle Whip
 Nut butter
 Almond butter
 Cashew butter
 Hazelnut butter
 Peanut butter
 Obatzda
 Palm butter – a spread made of palm oil designed to imitate dairy butter
 Paprykarz szczeciński – Polish spread made from ground fish, rice, tomato paste, vegetable oil, onion, salt and spices
 Pâté
 Chopped liver
 Liver pâté
 Pheasant paste
 Pesto
 Peabutter
 Pimento cheese
 Pindjur – Bulgarian, Serbian, Bosnian and Macedonian spread which ingredients include red bell peppers, tomatoes, garlic, vegetable oil and salt
 Remoulade – European cold sauce based on mayonnaise
 Rillettes – French paste made with pork or other meats and sometimes with anchovies, tuna or salmon
 Schmaltz – rendered (clarified) chicken or goose fat
 Sobrassada – typical from the Balearic Isles, made from pork, paprika, salt and other spices.
 Sunflower butter
 Tahini – paste made from ground, husk hulled sesame seeds
 Tapenade – Provençal spread of puréed or finely chopped olives, capers and anchovies
 Taramasalata – Greek meze made from salted and cured roe of the cod, carp or grey mullet mixed with olive oil, lemon juice, and bread or potatoes
 Tartar sauce
 Zacuscă – vegetable spread popular in Romania and Moldova

Cheeses and cheese spreads

Cheeses used as a spread and cheese spreads include:
 Almogrote
 Alouette cheese
 Beer cheese
 Benedictine
 Brie – sometimes used as a spread
 Catupiry
 Cheez Whiz
 Cervelle de canut
 Cold pack cheese
 Cottage cheese
 Cream cheese
 Creole cream cheese
 Cup cheese
 Dairylea
 Easy Cheese
 Farmer cheese – sometimes used as a spread
 Fromage blanc
 Fromage fort
 Laughing Cow
 Liptauer
 Moretum
 Obatzda
 Pimento cheese
 Port wine cheese
 Primula Cheese Spread
 Pub cheese
 Requeijão
 Rushan cheese
 Tirokafteri
Prim

Fruit spreads and preserves

Fruit spreads and preserves include:
Apple butter – Caramelized, concentrated apple sauce 
 Apricot Jam
 Bar-le-duc jelly
 Berry Jam
 Berries
 Birnenhonig
 Cabell d'àngel
 Chutney
 Coconut jam
 Confit
 Confiture
 Confiture de lait
 Conserves
 Eggplant jam
 Fruit butter
 Fruit curd
 Guava jelly
 Hagebuttenmark – a fruit preserve made from rose hips, sugar and sometimes red wine
 Lekvar
 Lingonberry jam
 Marmalade
 Nièr beurre
 Pepper jelly
 Powidl – a plum butter prepared without additional sweeteners or gelling agents
 Quince cheese
 Sirop de Liège – prepared using evaporated fruit juices
 Tomato jam
 Ube halaya – also known as Ube jam
 Yuja-cheong

Yeast extract spreads

Yeast extract spreads include:
 AussieMite
 Cenovis
 Guinness Yeast Extract
 Marmite
 Marmite (New Zealand)
 Oxo
 Promite
 Vegemite
 Vitam-R

See also

 Fondue
 List of butter dishes
 List of condiments
 List of dips
 List of food pastes
 List of syrups
 Spoon sweets – sweet preserves, served in a spoon as a gesture of hospitality in Greece, the Balkans, parts of the Middle East, and Russia
 Yogurt

References

Further reading
  320 pages.

External links
 

Butter
Spreads